Thiago dos Santos (born 5 September 1989), known as Thiago Santos, is a Brazilian footballer who plays as a defensive midfielder for Grêmio. He previously played for Palmeiras.

Career statistics

Honours
Palmeiras
Campeonato Brasileiro Série A: 2016, 2018

Grêmio
Campeonato Gaúcho: 2021, 2022
Recopa Gaúcha: 2021, 2022

References

External links
 

1989 births
Living people
Footballers from Curitiba
Brazilian footballers
Association football midfielders
Campeonato Brasileiro Série A players
Campeonato Brasileiro Série B players
Campeonato Brasileiro Série C players
Campeonato Brasileiro Série D players
União Recreativa dos Trabalhadores players
Nacional Esporte Clube (MG) players
Ipatinga Futebol Clube players
Clube Atlético Linense players
América Futebol Clube (MG) players
Sociedade Esportiva Palmeiras players
FC Dallas players
Major League Soccer players
Grêmio Foot-Ball Porto Alegrense players